Hacıqədirli (also, Gadzhi-Kadyrli, Gadzhykadirli, and Saran-Khadzhi-Kadyr) is a village and municipality in the Agsu Rayon of Azerbaijan.  It has a population of 298.

References 

Populated places in Agsu District